Enneapterygius triserialis, the white-spotted triplefin, is a species of triplefin blenny in the genus Enneapterygius. It was described by Ronald Fricke in 1994. This species occurs in the southwest Pacific from Australia east through New Caledonia, Vanuatu, Tonga, Fiji, American Samoa and French Polynesia.

References

triserialis
Fish described in 1994